Augusto Espinosa Valderrama (5 June 1919 – 1986) was a Colombian lawyer and politician who served as Liberal Party Representative, Senator and President of the Senate in the Congress of Colombia. He also served as the Permanent Representative of Colombia to the United Nations, and as the Ambassador of Colombia to the United Kingdom.

Selected works

References

1919 births
1986 deaths
People from Bucaramanga
National University of Colombia alumni
Colombian Liberal Party politicians
Colombian Ministers of Agriculture
Ambassadors of Colombia to the United Kingdom
Members of the Chamber of Representatives of Colombia
Members of the Senate of Colombia
Permanent Representatives of Colombia to the United Nations
Presidents of the Senate of Colombia
20th-century Colombian lawyers